Paweł Piwko (born 7 October 1982) is a Polish team handball player.

He participated at the 2008 Summer Olympics, where Poland finished 5th.

He was born in Dzierżoniów.

External links
 Profile

1982 births
Living people
People from Dzierżoniów
Polish male handball players
Handball players at the 2008 Summer Olympics
Olympic handball players of Poland
Vive Kielce players
Sportspeople from Lower Silesian Voivodeship